This is a list of horror films that were released in 2017.

References

2017
2017-related lists